The West (French: L'occident) is a 1938 French drama film directed by Henri Fescourt and starring Charles Vanel, José Noguéro and Hélène Robert. It is a remake of the director's own 1928 silent film of the same title.

The film's sets were designed by the art director Jean Douarinou.

Synopsis
The film portrays the relationship between a female Moroccan student, who has been forced to leave her studies at the Sorbonne for financial reasons and works as a dancer in a Paris nightclub, and a French naval officer. However, on returning to Casablanca she is tricked into believing that he had the led attack on her village that wiped out her family. She begins to plot her revenge.

Cast

See also
Eye for Eye (1918)

References

Bibliography 
 Kennedy-Karpat, Colleen. Rogues, Romance, and Exoticism in French Cinema of the 1930s. Fairleigh Dickinson, 2013.

External links 
 

1938 films
French drama films
1938 drama films
1930s French-language films
Films directed by Henri Fescourt
Films set in Paris
Films set in Casablanca
Remakes of French films
Sound film remakes of silent films
French black-and-white films
1930s French films